Rhectosemia tumidicosta is a moth in the family Crambidae. It was described by George Hampson in 1913. It is found in Colombia and Bolivia.

References

Spilomelinae
Moths described in 1913